Antonio Rodrigo Guirao Díaz (born 18 January 1980), known professionally as Rodrigo Guirao, is an Argentine actor.

Early life 
Guirao was born in Vicente López, Buenos Aires. At age 11, he lost his father and from that moment his mother was in charge of the family. He has a twin and two other brothers, Gonzalo and Ramiro.

Before turning entirely to acting, Guirao held various jobs as an electrician of a business video games, cadet, waiter and finally in advertising as a model.

Career 
Guirao studied acting at the General San Martín Cultural Center and since then has followed a lot of courses of interpretation.

He began working as a model for graphics and TV commercials and acted in parallel in juvenile series such as Rebelde Way, and in Paraíso Rock.

Between 2006 and 2007, Guirao was the leading man of Araceli González in the Argentine series Amas de casa desesperadas. After that he participated in the TV series Son de Fierro y Patito feo.

Between 2008 and 2009, he was in Atracción x 4, with Luisana Lopilato, made her film debut in Cinderella, directed by Alicia Zanca.

In 2009, Guirao starred in Botineras, and between 2010 and 2012 starred in the Italian TV series Terra ribelle, where he played the role of Andrea.

A year later he starred with Italian actress Vittoria Puccini in Violetta, which is based on the novel Lady of the camellias by Alexandre Dumas.

In 2013, Guirao appeared in the Argentine television series Mi amor, mi amor. In Spain, he debuted in Bienvenidos al Lolita, in 2014. In the same country, he starred as first character in Solo Química, a movie directed by Alfonso Albacete. In 2015 he debuted on Telemundo's TV series, filmed in Mexico, Señora Acero. And he participated in the second and third season that is still filming.

In the meanwhile, he participated in three films and a short, of which, Baires movie, filmed in Buenos Aires premiered in 2015, the short film directed by Isabel Coixet, "A broken heart is not like a broken vase" in 2016 and A Place in the Caribbean and "5 am", the first made in Roatan, Honduras, and the second one in Buenos Aires.

Filmography

Movies 
{| class="wikitable sortable"
! Year 
! Movie
! Character
! Director

|-
| rowspan="2" |2015
| Baires
| 'el mono'''
| Marcelo Páez-Cubells
|-
| Solo química   
| Eric Soto 
| Alfonso Albacete
|-
|2016
|Un corazón roto no es como un jarrón roto o un florero 
|Julio 
|Isabel Coixet
|-
| rowspan="2" | 2017
| 5 Am| Rafael 
| Ezio Massa 
|-
|A Place in the Caribbean|Paolo  
|Juan Carlos Fanconi
|-
|2019
|Punto Muerto 
|'Lupus'|Daniel de la Vega
|-
|2021
|После тебя / Después de Ti
|Matias
|osé Ramón Chávez
|}

Theatre
 La Cenicienta'' (2002) as Prince

Music videos
 Erreway - Inmortal (model)

References

External links
 

1980 births
21st-century Argentine male actors
Argentine male film actors
Argentine male models
Argentine male stage actors
Argentine male television actors
Living people
Male actors from Buenos Aires